Allaoua Khellil (born July 24, 1954) is a male former long-distance runner from Algeria, who represented his native North African country at the 1988 Summer Olympics in Seoul, South Korea. He won the 1987 edition of the Reims Marathon, clocking a total time of 2:16:39 on October 18, 1987.

Achievements

External links
 1993 Year Ranking
 sports-reference

1954 births
Living people
Algerian male long-distance runners
Athletes (track and field) at the 1988 Summer Olympics
Olympic athletes of Algeria
Algerian male marathon runners
African Games medalists in athletics (track and field)
African Games bronze medalists for Algeria
Athletes (track and field) at the 1991 All-Africa Games
21st-century Algerian people
20th-century Algerian people